S-OS is a simple operating system mainly for Z80 based computers. The operating system was first presented in 1986 in the Japanese magazine Oh!X in an article called "The Sentinel".

Commands 
The command and command set is very simplified.
Directory #D [<device name>:]
Change default device (S=startup, A=tape..) #DV <device name>:
Jump to address (and run program) #J <address>
Load the program #L <filename>[:<address>]
Enter the machine specific monitor #M
Delete the file #K <file name>
Save a memory block to file #S <filename>: <start address>: <end address>[: <execution address>]
Exit from S-OS and reboot #!

Supported systems 
 Sharp MZ-80K/C/1200
 Sharp MZ-700 / 1500
 Sharp MZ-80B / 2000 / 2200
 Sharp MZ-2500/2861(MZ-2500 mode)
 Sharp X1/C/D/Cs/Ck/F/G/Twin (two different implementations)
 Sharp X1turbo/II/III/Z/ZII/ZIII
 NEC PC-8001/8801
 NEC PC-6001mkII/6601/SR
 Sony SMC-777C
 Toshiba PASOPIA
 Fujitsu FM-7 / 77 (Z80 extension card)
 Sharp X68000 (emulated Z80)
 PC-286/NEC PC-9801 (emulated Z80)
 MSX 2 / 2+ / turboR
 Casio FP-1000 / 1100
 Windows 32 bit (emulated Z80)
 Sharp calculators PC-G850/S/V/VS

References

External links
 http://www.retropc.net/ohishi/s-os/
 http://homepage2.nifty.com/akikawa/sword/index.html
 http://www16.ocn.ne.jp/~ver0/g800/#sos

Microcomputer software

ja:Oh!X#THE_SENTINEL